The 2023 Open Quimper Bretagne was a professional tennis tournament played on hard courts. It was the 14th edition of the tournament which was part of the 2023 ATP Challenger Tour. It took place in Quimper, France between 24 and 29 January 2023.

Singles main-draw entrants

Seeds

 1 Rankings are as of 16 January 2023.

Other entrants
The following players received wildcards into the singles main draw:
  Arthur Fils
  Pierre-Hugues Herbert
  Lucas Pouille

The following players received entry into the singles main draw as alternates:
  Sebastian Ofner
  Santiago Rodríguez Taverna

The following players received entry from the qualifying draw:
  Calvin Hemery
  Illya Marchenko
  Nicolas Moreno de Alboran
  Giovanni Mpetshi Perricard
  Johan Tatlot
  Bu Yunchaokete

The following players received entry as lucky losers:
  Evan Furness
  Nick Hardt

Champions

Singles

 Grégoire Barrère def.  Arthur Fils 6–1, 6–4.

Doubles

 Sadio Doumbia /  Fabien Reboul def.  Anirudh Chandrasekar /  Arjun Kadhe 6–2, 6–4.

References

2023 ATP Challenger Tour
2023
January 2023 sports events in France
2023 in French tennis